The 2008 Paris–Nice, the 66th running of the race, took place from March 9 to March 16, 2008, and was won by Italian Davide Rebellin from , who finished second last year. The race started in Amilly and ended in Nice. The 2008 edition returned to the fabled climb of Mont Ventoux, with stage four finishing at the mountain's ski facility, Mont Serein. The Mont Ventoux stage saw a winning break by Cadel Evans and Robert Gesink. Evans took the stage victory as Gesink moved into the overall lead. However, Gesink could not hold on to the lead in stage six when Rebellin attacked on the final descent and took enough time to move into the overall lead.

The event was marked by controversy before the race regarding the ongoing power struggle between ASO and UCI, excluding the race from the UCI ProTour calendar. The race organisers also decided to exclude , the team of the 2007 edition winner Alberto Contador, due to "damage caused by the team during the 2007 Tour de France".

Stages

Prologue – March 9, 2008: Amilly, 4,6 km (ITT)

Stage 1 – March 10, 2008: La Chapelotte > Nevers, 93.5 km 

This stage was originally supposed to start in Amilly, but because of a storm with gale force winds and rain, the route was shortened by 91 km and started in La Chapelotte instead.

Stage 2 – March 11, 2008: Nevers > Belleville, 201 km

Stage 3 – March 12, 2008: Fleurie > Saint-Étienne, 165.5 km

Stage 4 – March 13, 2008: Montélimar > Mont-Serein, 176 km

Stage 5 – March 14, 2008: Althen-des-Paluds > Sisteron, 172,5 km

Stage 6 – March 15, 2008: Sisteron > Cannes, 206 km

Stage 7 – March 16, 2008: Nice > Nice, 119 km

Final standings

General classification

Jersey progress 

Jersey wearers when one rider is leading two or more competitions
 On stage 1, Markel Irizar wore the green jersey
 On stage 2, Karsten Kroon wore the green jersey
 On stage 3, Gert Steegmans wore the green jersey
 On stages 5 & 6, Luis León Sánchez wore the white jersey

Withdrawals 
Only 86 riders finished the race of the 160 that started. Almost 40 riders abandoned during the last stage.

Teams and cyclists 
The following 20 UCI ProTour and UCI Professional Continental teams were selected to the 2008 Paris–Nice:

The  is the only ProTour team not to be invited to this event because of the "damage caused by the team during the 2007 Tour de France".

References

External links

cyclingfans.com Paris–Nice 2008 Live guide, photos, commentary.
cyclingnews

Paris–Nice
Paris-Nice
Paris-Nice
Paris-Nice